The 2017–18 Korvpalli Meistriliiga season (also known as the Alexela Korvpalli Meistriliiga for sponsorship reasons) was the 93rd season of top-tier basketball in Estonia.

The season began on 5 October 2017 and concluded on 24 May 2017 with Kalev/Cramo defeating University of Tartu 4 games to 0 in the finals to win their 10th Estonian Championship.

Teams

Venues and locations

Personnel and sponsorship

Coaching changes

Regular season
During the regular season teams will play 4 rounds for 28 games (2 at home and 2 away) with following exception:

G4S Noorteliiga will play 2 rounds (1 round at home and 1 round away in total).

Double points will be awarded to teams winning those games.

League table

Results

Playoffs

The playoffs began on 17 April and ended on 24 May 2018. The tournament concluded with Kalev/Cramo defeating University of Tartu 4 games to 0 in the finals.

Bracket

Individual statistics
Players qualify to this category by having at least 50% games played.

Points

Rebounds

Assists

All-Star Game
The 2018 All-Star Game was played on 16 February 2018 in Tallinn at the Saku Suurhall. Team Olybet LBL won the game 127–126 in overtime. The MVP of the game was Isaiah Briscoe, who scored 39 points.

Awards

Finals Most Valuable Player
 Kristjan Kangur (Kalev/Cramo)

Best Young Player
 Matthias Tass (Kalev/Cramo / TTÜ)

Best Defender
 Mihkel Kirves (Port of Pärnu)

Coach of the Year
 Donaldas Kairys (Kalev/Cramo)

All-KML Team

Player of the Month

See also
 2017–18 Basketball Champions League
 2017–18 FIBA Europe Cup
 2017–18 VTB United League
 2017–18 Baltic Basketball League
 2017–18 Latvian Basketball League

References

External links
Official website 

Korvpalli Meistriliiga seasons
Estonian
KML